The 1918–19 Lancashire Cup was the eleventh competition for this regional rugby league tournament and the first since 1914–15. This quickly arranged competition was won by the holders Rochdale Hornets who beat local rivals Oldham in the final at The Willows, Salford by a score of 22-0. The attendance at the final was 18,617 and receipts £1,365.

Background 
The shortened 1918–19 (February–May) season began less than three months after the end of the First World War and the armistice of Compiègne.

A Wartime Emergency League had been operating since September 1918. This was cancelled, and the programme started tailing off in January 1919. A new shortened season was introduced with the traditional Lancashire and Yorkshire leagues, to cut travel costs and minimise the use of precious resources. The return of the Challenge Cup would have to wait until the following 1919–20 season, but the Northern Union did manager to re-introduce both the County Cups.

One pre-war club was lost - Runcorn, one of the founder members after the great schism of 1895, after taking part in the previous Wartime Emergency League, withdrew and folded.  They were replaced by St Helens Recs (effectively the works team for Pilkington Glass) who had entered the 1915–16 Wartime Emergency League and took place in this, their first, Lancashire Cup.

The number of teams entering this year’s competition was again 12 with four byes in the first round.

Competition and results

Round 1  
Involved  4 matches (with four byes) and 12 clubs

Round 2 – quarterfinals

Round 3 – semifinals

Final

Teams and scorers 

Scoring - Try = three (3) points - Goal = two (2) points - Drop goal = two (2) points

The road to success

Notes and comments 
 1 The first game played in the Lancashire Cup by the “new” club.
 2 The first Lancashire Cup match played at Barrow’s “new” ground.
 3 The Willows was the home ground of Salford.

See also 
1919 (Feb-May) Northern Rugby Football Union Victory season

References

1919 1
Lancashire Cup 1